The 2009 Challenge Bell was a tennis tournament played on indoor carpet courts. It was the 17th edition of the Challenge Bell, and was part of the WTA International tournaments of the 2009 WTA Tour. It was held at the PEPS de l'Université Laval in Quebec City, Canada, from September 14 through September 20, 2009.

Entrants

Seeds

1 Rankings are as of August 31, 2009

Other entrants
The following players received wildcards into the singles main draw
 Heidi El Tabakh
 Rebecca Marino 
 Bethanie Mattek-Sands

The following players received entry from the qualifying draw:
 Mallory Cecil
 Lilia Osterloh
 Amra Sadiković
 Anna Tatishvili

The following player received entry as a lucky loser:
 Olga Puchkova

Withdrawals
Before the tournament
 Sabine Lisicki (ankle injury)

Champions

Singles

 Melinda Czink def.  Lucie Šafářová, 4–6, 6–3, 7–5

Doubles

  Vania King /   Barbora Záhlavová-Strýcová  def.  Sofia Arvidsson /  Séverine Brémond Beltrame, 6–1, 6–3

External links
Official website

Challenge Bell
Tournoi de Québec
Challenge Bell
2000s in Quebec City